Scajaquada Creek is a stream in Erie County, New York, United States.  The name is derived from Philip Kenjockety, a Native American described as the oldest resident of the region upon his death in 1808.

The creek lends its name to the Scajaquada Expressway, New York State Route 198, a highway that briefly adjoins the creek's southern shore. A bike path follows the creek's northern shore most of the way from Delaware Park to the Niagara River. Buffalo State College, the Albright-Knox Art Gallery and the Buffalo History Museum overlook Scajaquada Creek.

Course
The creek passes through most of the Town of Cheektowaga before it is diverted into an underground culvert. The culvert carries the creek for miles through much of Buffalo, emerging in Forest Lawn. The creek passes through the Forest Lawn Cemetery, next to Delaware Park, and over Serenity Falls. It is one of two waterfalls in Buffalo, along with Cazenovia Park Falls. While the Scajaquada once flowed into Hoyt Lake in Delaware Park, it was buried by 1921 in response to pollution and urban development. Today, it bypasses the lake through a channel and culvert on the lake's south shore. The creek flows through part of the Erie Canal known as the Black Rock Canal, then empties into the Niagara River.

1814 Battle

In early August, 1814, during The War of 1812 a force of about 600 British Soldiers crossed into New York from Canada in an attempt to raid American supply depots kept in Black Rock, New York in preparation for the Siege of Fort Erie.  American Riflemen, having detected the British landing prepared, defenses at Scajaquada Creek, then known as "Conjocta Creek".  British Forces attempted to cross the creek to reach Black Rock, but became engaged in an intense skirmish with the roughly 200 American riflemen defending the creek.  The fighting lasted an hour before the British force retreated to Canada. The British force suffered 12 killed and 17 wounded, the Americans 2 killed and 8 wounded. English Author and Inventor, Shadrack Byfield was wounded in the Battle and had his arm amputated as a result.

References

External links 
 Scajaquada Creek information
 Photos of Scajaquada Creek and the Black Rock Canal
 Serenity Falls in Forest Lawn Cemetery
 Cazenovia Park Falls
 Serenity Falls
 Battle of Conjocta Creek

Geography of Buffalo, New York
Subterranean rivers of the United States
Rivers of Erie County, New York